"Heartbeat" is a song by Polish singer Margaret. It was included on her debut studio album Add the Blonde (2014), and released to Polish contemporary hit radio as its third single on 23 February 2015. The "Special Limited Box" edition of Add the Blonde released on 23 December 2016 included a 7-inch vinyl of the single "Cool Me Down" with "Heartbeat" as the A-side. "Heartbeat" was written by Margaret and Joakim Buddee. Some of its lyrics were influenced by Michael Jackson's song "Beat It".

The single reached number 11 on the Polish Airplay Chart.

Music video
The song's music video was directed by Olga Czyżykiewicz. It was released on 12 June 2015.

Accolades

Charts

Weekly charts

Release history

References

2015 singles
2015 songs
Magic Records singles
Margaret (singer) songs
Songs written by Margaret (singer)